The Mouse That Roared is a 1959 British satirical comedy film on a Ban The Bomb theme, based on Leonard Wibberley's novel The Mouse That Roared (1955).  It stars Peter Sellers in three roles: Duchess Gloriana XII; Count Rupert Mountjoy, the Prime Minister; and Tully Bascomb, the military leader; and co-stars Jean Seberg. The film was directed by Jack Arnold, and the screenplay was written by Roger MacDougall and Stanley Mann.

Plot
The minuscule European Duchy of Grand Fenwick is bankrupted when an American company comes up with a cheaper imitation of Fenwick's sole export, its fabled Pinot Grand Fenwick wine. Crafty Prime Minister Count Mountjoy (Peter Sellers) devises a plan: Grand Fenwick will declare war on the United States, then surrender, taking advantage of American largesse toward its defeated enemies to rebuild the defeated nation's economy. Duchess Gloriana (also Sellers) is hesitant but agrees to the plan. Mild-mannered game warden Tully Bascomb (also Sellers) is charged as Field Marshal to lead the Grand Fenwick troops, aided by Sergeant Will Buckley (William Hartnell).

The contingent of 20 soldiers in medieval mail books passage across the Atlantic on a small merchant ship, arriving in New York Harbor during an air-raid drill that leaves the city deserted and undefended. They chance upon a civil defence truck and are mistaken for invading Martians, prompting an investigation by blustering but ineffectual General Snippet (MacDonald Parke). Puncturing the tyres of the general's jeep with their bows and arrows, the Grand Fenwick troops take him and four police officers hostage. Still looking for a place to surrender, Tully and Will stumble across Dr. Alfred Kokintz (David Kossoff), whose invention of the Q Bomb – capable of destroying an entire continent – has prompted the defence drills. He has built a football-sized prototype of the unstable bomb, which Tully takes possession of. With Kokintz and his attractive daughter Helen (Jean Seberg) as additional hostages, Tully declares victory and returns with them to Grand Fenwick.

The duchess indulges Tully's victory, and the prime minister resigns in disgust at Tully's blunder, leaving him as acting prime minister. When the incident is discovered, the U.S. government is thwarted from retaking the weapon and hostages by force, fearing the dishonour of attacking such a small and defenceless nation. Instead, they send the U.S. Secretary of Defense (Austin Willis) to discuss terms of surrender and get back the bomb. Meanwhile, Grand Fenwick receives competing offers of defensive aid from each of the world's powers, in exchange for the weapon.

Tully becomes smitten with Helen, who initially despises him for taking them but falls for his simple charm. Then Snippet and Mountjoy conspire to steal the bomb and return it (and Helen) to America, but Tully gives chase and retrieves it.  The Secretary of Defense and Tully agree to terms: the knock-off wine will be taken off the market, Grand Fenwick will receive monetary aid from the US, Helen and her father will remain in Grand Fenwick, and so will the bomb: held by "the little countries of the world" as a weapon of last resort if the superpowers refuse to disarm.

Checking the bomb for damage, Tully, Helen, and Dr. Kokintz find it was "a dud" all along, and leave it in the dungeon, conspiring to keep its impotence secret. However, after they leave, a mouse emerges from it, and it appears to rearm, sitting ready to explode if disturbed.

Cast 
 Peter Sellers as Duchess Gloriana XII/Prime Minister Count Rupert Mountjoy/Tully Bascombe
 Jean Seberg as Helen Kokintz
 William Hartnell as Will Buckley
 David Kossoff as Doctor Alfred Kokintz
 Leo McKern as Benter
 MacDonald Parke as General Snippet
 Austin Willis as United States Secretary of Defense
 Timothy Bateson as Roger
 Monte Landis as Cobbley
 Alan Gifford as Air Raid Warden
 Colin Gordon as BBC Announcer
 Harold Kasket as Pedro

Production 
Stage rights to the book were bought in 1955 by Howard Dietz.

Walter Shenson was doing publicity for Abandon Ship! (1956) in England in 1956 when given a copy of the novel by that film's star Tyrone Power. Shenson optioned the film rights in 1957 as his first independent production. He spent over a year trying to raise finance. He eventually obtained interest from Carl Foreman who had an arrangement to produce films for Columbia through his Highroad Films.

Changes from book
Liberties were taken in the film adaptation to display Peter Sellers' versatile comedy talents. The lead character of the book is the Duchess Gloriana XII, an attractive young royal in the manner of the young Queen Elizabeth II and Princess Grace.

In the film version, however, Peter Sellers plays the role as a parody of an elderly Queen Victoria (who thinks the president of the United States is Calvin Coolidge), and his Mountjoy is a parody of Benjamin Disraeli.

The sequences for Marseille and New York Harbor were filmed in Southampton; the presence of the  ocean liner there was a lucky coincidence. In addition, in the novel, an encounter with the New York Police Department leads to bloodshed that complicates peace negotiations; this does not appear in the film.

Additionally, in the film, both Tully and Helen are with Dr. Kokintz when he discovers the bomb is a dud, and it is Tully who suggests that they keep that fact a secret; in the book, Dr. Kokintz discovers the fact alone and keeps it to himself.

Casting
The lead role went to Peter Sellers. The female lead went to Jean Seberg, who was then under contract to Columbia. At the time William Hartnell was well known for playing army sergeants, having played Sgt. Grimshaw in Carry on Sergeant in 1958 and Sgt. Maj. Percy Bullimore in the TV sitcom The Army Game.

Shooting
Title designer Maurice Binder added a mouse in an opening joke with the Columbia Pictures logo.

One scene has diplomats playing a board game called Diplomacy, but the game more resembles Monopoly rather than the game Diplomacy.

Reception
The film did not perform up to expectations in the UK earning theatrical rentals of $200,000 but was a surprise hit at the US box office with rentals of $2 million. It was felt that the reluctance of the characters to join the army in a time of need was received less well in the UK than in the US.

The Los Angeles Times wrote the film "laid an egg", but Bosley Crowther at The New York Times offered a more positive review.

On Rotten Tomatoes, the film has an approval rating of 90%, based on reviews from 20 critics.

Adaptations

Television pilot 
In 1964, Jack Arnold obtained exclusive television rights for The Mouse That Roared from Leonard Wibberley.  He produced and directed a television pilot with ABC Television and Screen Gems called The Mouse That Roared,  starring Sid Caesar as the Duchess, Mountjoy, and Tully, and co-starring Joyce Jameson, Sigrid Valdis, and Richard Deacon. However, the pilot was not picked up for production. It was filmed by Richard H. Kline.

Sequel
Richard Lester directed the sequel The Mouse on the Moon (1963), adapted from Wibberley's 1962 novel The Mouse on the Moon.

Home video
The film was released on VHS 14 July 1993. It was also released on DVD for the first time on 8 July 2003. It was released on Blu-Ray in Australia by Umbrella Entertainment on 7 April 2021.

References

External links

 
 
 
 
 

1959 films
1959 comedy films
British comedy films
British satirical films
British political satire films
Columbia Pictures films
Films based on Irish novels
Films set in Europe
Films set in a fictional country
Films set in New York City
Films directed by Jack Arnold
1950s satirical films
Films with screenplays by Stanley Mann
1950s British films